Souk Naâmane District is a district of Oum El Bouaghi Province, Algeria.

References

Districts of Oum El Bouaghi Province